Anne Roxanne Barcelo (born January 20, 1985), also known as Roxee B, is a Filipino-American actress, model and singer. In 2006, she became one of the 14 housemates of ABS-CBN's Pinoy Big Brother: Celebrity Edition. Before entering the Big Brother House, she was a finalist of ABC's Hollywood Dream. She is best known for playing Natalie Alcantara in Wildflower. Roxanne played the role of young Alba, an antagonist and guest character of Los Bastardos.

Personal life
Born in Fairfax, Virginia, she spent her childhood in the United States. She was only eight years old when she joined and won "Best of the Best", a singing contest in the United States. Her broadcasting talent was again put to the test when she became a member of ESPN Kids. Already a professional child model, she did TV commercials for the Smithsonian Museum's 150th anniversary, 4th of July, GAP and JC Penney.  She graduated from the School of the Holy Spirit in Quezon City and from Miriam College, also in Quezon City. In 2020, she married a non-showbiz personality in a private ceremony. She has one son.

Acting and singing career
Upon arriving in the Philippines when she was 13, she was a contestants in GMA's Metropop Search. Aside from that in 1999, Roxie became a mainstay in the GMA's then top-rated youth oriented show, Click, she learned so much in her 2½ years in the show. She also appeared in the television drama series Kahit Kailan and Sana Ay Ikaw Na Nga. She was a regular host of SOP and guest-starred in several GMA shows. Her song "Kung Alam Mo Lang" (If You Only Knew), the Tagalog version of "Because I'm A Girl" by the South Korean female pop trio band Kiss topped the Philippine music charts. She also has an album, Roxie released in 2004. In late 2003, she was asked along with Alessandra de Rossi to take part in "Biyahe Tayo" (a song meant to promote Philippine tourism) but she declined.

Other ventures
Roxee starred in a contemporary full-length film, Mudraks, which was screened for competition in 2006's Cinemalaya Film Festival. She played the daughter of the lead actress, Rio Locsin. The movie is about a dysfunctional family who never talk to each other.

Present career
In 2008, she returned to GMA Network, her home channel, whose rival station is ABS-CBN, to do a kiddy program as one of the main hosts; she was referred to as Ate Anne in the show called Batang Bibbo!. But in early 2009 she was cast to the most awaited fantasy series starring Marian Rivera in Darna. After Darna, she appeared on First Time, together with Joross Gamboa and Michelle Madrigal who were also a former ABS-CBN talents. In 2010, Roxee returned to hosting a children's show via Art Angel on GMA with original host Tonypet Gaba, replacing the former hosts.

She joined Alodia Gosiengfiao for the July 2013 edition of FHM Philippines. In 2014, she appeared again for Online Babe for FHM (now as FHM #NewCrush and Idols) for June 2014 as well as in the December 2014 issue of FHM.
 In 2016, she transferred to Talent5 to appear in Bakit Manipis ang Ulap?. In 2017, she returned to ABS-CBN, to play an antagonist role in Wildflower. In 2018, she played a young Alba in Los Bastardos.

Filmography

Television

Movies

Discography

Album
 Roxie – 2004 (under Universal Records)
 "WOW" ft. Q-York – 2014
 "Morena"  – 2014 (under Viva Records Corporation)

Notes

References

1985 births
Living people
American people of Filipino descent
21st-century Filipino actresses
American emigrants to the Philippines
Filipino child actresses
Filipino female models
Filipino film actresses
Filipino television actresses
People from Quezon City
Actresses from Metro Manila
GMA Network personalities
Participants in Philippine reality television series
Pinoy Big Brother contestants
ABS-CBN personalities
Star Magic
Viva Artists Agency